Wovoka is the fifth album by Mexican American/Native American rock band Redbone. It was recorded between June and October of 1973, and was summarily released in November 1973 on Epic Records. It adds elements of Cajun and R&B to the band's signature style. The album was produced by brothers Pat Vegas (bass, vocals) and Lolly Vegas (guitars, vocals), in addition to sound engineer Alex Kazanegras. It was the last Redbone album to feature Peter DePoe on drums. The album was recorded with the help of multiple session musicians, including several additional backing vocalists. All main members of the band notably contributed to vocals. The album peaked on the US Billboard 200 at number 66 in 1974. The single "We Were All Wounded at Wounded Knee" topped the Belgian and Dutch charts in 1973, but was notably absent from the American release after it was deemed too offensive for some audiences.

Track listing

LP
The track We Were All Wounded at Wounded Knee was dropped from the US/Canadian release (KE 32462) due to its controversial theme. The song did appear on the European release (EPC 65500), and was moderately successful on the continent (see main Redbone entry).

The LP version of Come and Get Your Love starts with a slow rendition of the chorus. This intro was cut from the single release.

Side one
"Wovoka" (P. Vegas/L. Vegas) – 3:00
"Sweet Lady of Love" (L. Vegas) – 3:08
"Someday (A Good Song)" (P. Vegas/T. Bellamy) – 4:12
"Liquid Truth" (L. Vegas) – 5:03
"We Were All Wounded at Wounded Knee" (P. Vegas/L. Vegas) - 3:34 [UK release only]

Side two
"Come and Get Your Love" (LP version) (L. Vegas) – 4:59
"Day to Day Life" (P. Vegas/T. Bellamy) – 2:42
"Chant Wovoka / "Clouds In My Sunshine" (P. Vegas) – 4:42
"23rd and Mad" (L. Vegas/P. DePoe) - 6:46

CD
Released on the Columbia label in 1990, several edits were made to the album. The CD featured the single version of Come and Get Your Love; the track boundary on the short Chant Wovoka vocal was moved; and the last track 23rd and Mad was  cut down.

"Wovoka" (P. Vegas/L. Vegas) – 3:00
"Sweet Lady of Love" (L. Vegas) – 3:08
"Someday (A Good Song)" (P. Vegas/T. Bellamy) – 4:12
"Liquid Truth" (L. Vegas) – 5:03
"Come and Get Your Love" (L. Vegas) – 3:27
"Day to Day Life" / "Chant Wovoka" (P. Vegas/T. Bellamy) – 3:04
"Clouds In My Sunshine" (P. Vegas) – 3:44
"23rd and Mad" (L. Vegas/P. DePoe) - 3:08

Charts

Album

Personnel
 Lolly Vegas – lead guitar, electric sitar, leslie guitar, vocals
 Tony Bellamy – rhythm guitar, wah wah guitar, piano, vocals
 Pat Vegas – bass, fuzz bass, vocals
 Butch Rillera – drums, background vocals
Peter DePoe – drums, background vocals

Additional personnel 
 Gene Page – orchestrator
 Joe Sample - piano, vibraphone
 Sherry Williams - background vocals
 Eddie Caciedo - percussion
 Johnny Lopez - background vocals

References

1974 albums
Redbone (band) albums
Epic Records albums